The Streptomycetaceae are a family of Actinomycetota, making up the monotypic order Streptomycetales. It includes the important genus Streptomyces. This was the original source of many antibiotics, namely streptomycin, the first antibiotic against tuberculosis.

Genomics
Sequence alignments of actinomycetotal genomes have led to the identification of three conserved signature indels which are unique to the order Streptomycetales. The enzyme PBGD contains a four-amino-acid insertion which is present in all Streptomyces species and Kitasatospora setae, but not any other Actinomycetota. Similarly, a one- amino-acid insertion is present in a conserved region of adenylate kinase and is found in all Streptomyces species and  K. setae, but is not found in any other Actinomycetota. 
Five conserved signature proteins have also been identified which are present in various sequenced Streptomyces species, but not in K. setae; however, as the complete genome of K. setae has not yet been sequenced, these proteins may be present in K. setae. Additionally, 11 conserved signature proteins have been identified which are found in all sequenced Streptomyces species and K. setae. These proteins are believed to be unique to the Streptomycetales order, thus provide molecular markers which can be used to distinguish this group from the rest of the Actinomycetota. 
Phylogenetic trees indicate that the order Catenulisporales is closely related to the order Streptomycetales. This inference is supported by a one-amino-acid conserved signature indel which is uniquely found in all Streptomycetales species and Catenulisporales acidiphilia, the only Catenulisporales species whose complete genome has been sequenced. Additionally, three conserved signature proteins have been identified which are found in all Streptomycetales species and C. acidiphilia. Both the conserved signature indel and the conserved signature proteins provide evidence that the orders Streptomycetales and Catenulisporales are closely related.

Phylogeny
The accepted taxonomy is based on the List of Prokaryotic names with Standing in Nomenclature (LPSN). The phylogeny is based on whole-genome analysis.

Notes

References

External links

Streptomycineae
Bacteria families